The Mercedes-Benz M273 engine is a V8 automobile piston engine family used in the 2000s (decade). It was based on the similar M272 V6 introduced in 2004.

An evolution of the M113 V8, all M273s have aluminium engine blocks, sequential fuel injection, forged steel connecting rods, a one-piece cast camshaft, and a magnesium intake manifold. The cylinders are lined with silicon/aluminium, and a dual-length Variable Length Intake Manifold is fitted.

In addition to this, new features shared with the M272 include DOHC aluminium cylinder heads, 4 valves per cylinder and independent continuously variable valve timing on both the intake and exhaust sides.
A new electronically controlled cooling system has eliminated the need for a mechanical thermostat for improved engine warm-up and optimum control of engine temperature.

E47
The E47 is a  version.

Applications:
 2007–2012 GL 450
 2007–2013 S 450
 2007–2011 ML 450

E55

The E55 is a  version.

Applications:
 2006–2011 E 500 / E 550
 2006–2010 CL 500 / CL 550
 2006–2010 CLS 500 / CLS 550
 2006–2012 GL 500 / GL 550
 2008–2011 ML 500 / ML 550
 2006–2009 S 500 / S 550
 2007–2012 SL 500 / SL 550
 2006–2009 CLK 500 / CLK 550
 2006-2015 G 500 / G 550
 2007-2014 R 500 / R 550
 2010-present KSU Gazal-1

*Note: 500 or 550 model naming varies depending on geographical market.

See also

 List of Mercedes-Benz engines

References

M273
V8 engines
Gasoline engines by model